Río Ancho may refer to:

Río Ancho (song), a classic flamenco track by Paco de Lucia
Río Ancho, Cuba, village in Sancti Spíritus, Cuba
Río Ancho, Colombia, a corregemiento in Dibulla, La Guajira, Colombia
Río Ancho (river),  a creek in the Sierra Nevada de Santa Marta range